Massaro is a surname. Notable people with the surname include:

Antonio del Massaro, nicknamed il Pastura (1450–1516), Italian painter
Ashley Massaro (1979–2019), American wrestler, valet and general manager
Bentinho Massaro (born 1988/1989), Dutch alleged cult founder
Daniele Massaro (born 1961), Italian football player
Davide Massaro (born 1998) Italian football player
Domingo Massaro (born 1927), Chilean football player and referee
Dominic W. Massaro, Professor of Psychology and Computer Engineering at the University of California, Santa Cruz
Francesco Massaro (born 1935), Italian director and screenwriter
John Massaro, music director for Blues in the Night with BTT
John Massaro (guitarist), guitarist for the 1980s band Kid Lightning
John R. Massaro (born 1930), 8th Sergeant Major of the US Marine Corps
Laura Massaro, English squash player
Mike Massaro, racing analyst at ESPN for the NASCAR Sprint Cup Series
Nicola Massaro, Italian painter of the late-Baroque period
Paulo Massaro (born 1981), football player
Roberto Massaro (born 1983), Italian football player
Ryan Massaro or Amos Lee (born 1977), American singer-songwriter
Sylvio Massaro, vocalist in Vanishing Point, an Australian pop group

See also
Massaro House, U.S. residence inspired by designs of a never-constructed project conceived by the architect Frank Lloyd Wright
Masari
Masaru
Masoro (disambiguation)
Massarah
Massari
Massaria
Massarosa
Masserano
Mazaro

Italian-language surnames